The 2004 Junior Oceania Cup was an international field hockey tournament hosted by New Zealand. The quadrennial tournament serves as the Junior Championship of Oceania organized by the Oceania Hockey Federation. It was held in Wellington, New Zealand, between 7 and 11 December 2004.

Australia and New Zealand were the only participating teams.

Australia won the tournament in both the men's and women's competitions. The tournament also served as a qualifier for the 2005 men's and women's Junior World Cups, with Australia qualifying for both.

Men's tournament

Results
All times are local (UTC+12).

Pool

Matches

Women's tournament

Results
All times are local (UTC+12).

Pool

Matches

References

Junior Oceania Cup
International field hockey competitions hosted by New Zealand
Sports competitions in Wellington
Junior Oceania Cup
2000s in Wellington
Oceania Cup
Junior Oceania Cup
Oceania Cup